Cosme Correa (fl. 1540s) was a Portuguese nobleman. The island of Salsette in Bombay was divided into Malar and Marol and granted for three years to Cosme Correa along with João Rodrigues Dantas and Manuel Correa.

References
Origin of Bombay, p. 96

History of Mumbai
16th-century Portuguese people